The 1999 Norwegian Football Cup Final was the final match of the 1999 Norwegian Football Cup, the 94th season of the Norwegian Football Cup, the premier Norwegian football cup competition organized by the Football Association of Norway (NFF). The match was played on 30 October 1999 at the Ullevaal Stadion in Oslo, and opposed two Tippeligaen sides Rosenborg and Brann. Rosenborg defeated Brann 2–0 to claim the Norwegian Cup for an eighth time in their history.

Match

Details

References

1999
Football Cup
Rosenborg BK matches
SK Brann matches
Norwegian Football Cup Final, 1999
Sports competitions in Oslo
Norwegian Football Cup Final